The Society of Wood Engravers (SWE) is a UK-based artists’ exhibiting society, formed in 1920, one of its founder-members being Eric Gill. It was originally restricted to artist-engravers printing with oil-based inks in a press, distinct from the separate discipline of woodcuts. Today, its support extends to other forms of relief printmaking, and awards honorary membership to collectors and enthusiasts.

History
The Society of Wood Engravers was founded on 27 March 1920 by a group of 10 artists who all wanted to promote wood engraving as a medium for modern artists. Unlike other societies of the time devoted to various aspects of relief printmaking, the SWE survived, successfully engaging up-coming generations, and celebrates its centenary in 2020.

The liberation of wood engraving as a medium for artists was begun in the 1890s. Charles Ricketts and Charles Haslewood Shannon were the first in modern times to cut the blocks of their own designs or, more to the point, create their designs by the process of engraving them. This was well before the SWE was thought of. The foundation of the Society built on the development of this approach by a later generation of artists and in the Modernist era. Their names are listed below.  Historically, white-line engraving on end-grain wood and black-line work on the plank side of the wood were both referred to as ‘woodcuts’. The habit of calling the first method ‘wood engraving’, and the second ‘woodcut’, crystallised after World War II.

The Society went into abeyance during the 1960s but was revived in 1984 by Hilary Paynter. The major regeneration of the SWE, virtually amounting to a re-foundation after a difficult mid-century, was built on the distinction between ‘wood engraving’ and ‘woodcut’: by then the more visible as the two traditions developed in different ways.  Now that synthetic materials can be used for engraving on, it has been suggested that it is the fine engraving rather than the material engraved which really defines the medium; this is the quality many practitioners are drawn to and the reason for the continued growth of the Society. The SWE supports all kinds of relief printmaking but chiefly promotes fine wood engraving – as its name implies.

Founder members
 Philip Hagreen
 Lucien Pissarro
 Robert Gibbings
 E M O’Rourke Dickey
 Sydney Lee
 Noel Rooke
 Edward Gordon Craig
 Eric Gill
 Gwen Raverat
 John Nash

Aims
The SWE was founded primarily to promote wood engraving in the European manner – printing with oil-based inks in a press, rather than with water-based ink and manual pressure in the Japanese tradition. Secondly, its aim was to promote the work of artist-engravers as distinct from the nineteenth-century artisans, who engraved designs provided by artists but were not necessarily artists themselves. The artists Noel Rooke and Robert Gibbings, were the driving force behind the society. They determined to hold annual exhibitions of their work and to promote wood engraving through teaching. Current members remain committed to this ethos 100 years later.

Annual exhibition
Wood engraving has multiple applications in fine-art prints, in book illustration and in commerce. It attracts passionate practitioners who continue to develop experimental themes. The Society reflects these in its annual exhibitions. The Annual Exhibition is the largest and most important event in the SWE’s calendar, showing relief prints of all kinds, though wood engravings predominate. Submission to this exhibition is open to members and non-members alike. All entries go before a selection committee which includes the current Chairperson and two other elected Members of the Society. Initially restricted to London, the show now tours the UK visiting established galleries and those in remote areas where wood engraving may not have been seen before.

Subscribers and members
Subscription to the Society is by payment of an annual fee. The Society welcomes enthusiasts, collectors, as well as artists.

In order to become a member, the applicant must have exhibited wood engravings in the Annual Exhibition for three years, although these don’t need to run consecutively. Submission of a portfolio of work including preparatory work and sketch books will then be subject to scrutiny by the Member’s Selection Committee. All new members receive a copy of the Society’s constitution and may enter a third piece of work for the annual show in addition to the two allowed for non-members.

The Society also recognises non-engravers who work hard on its behalf by awarding them Honorary Membership.

An AGM is held, usually in the autumn, to which everyone is invited. Another social gathering held annually is the SWE Picnic which usually features an auction of prints and books. The Society has cordial relations with the Wood Engravers’ Network (WEN), an American group with similar aims.

Publications
The SWE publishes a monthly on-line Newsletter of up-coming events and a quarterly journal of record, information and discussion entitled ‘Multiples’. These are circulated to all subscribers and members.

Special occasion publications range from Christmas cards and broadsheets to limited edition boxed sets of engravings.

Teaching
Imparting information and teaching wood engraving are strong components of the SWE's commitment.

Funding
The SWE receives no outside funding.  A bequest from earlier member William Rawlinson has enabled grants to students and funding for special projects.  More recently, Rachel Reckitt has bequeathed annual prizes.

Chair persons
Since 1984 the committee has been chaired by the following people:
 George Tute 1984 – 1986
 Simon Brett 1986 – 1992
 Ian Stephens 1992 – 1995
 Sarah van Niekerk 1995 – 1998
 Hilary Paynter 1998 – 2006
 Peter Lawrence 2006 – 2011
 Harry Brockway 2011 – 2014
 Geri Waddington 2015 – 2018
 Chris Daunt 2018 – 2020
Merlin Waterson – Current Chair since 2020

Other former members
 David Jones
 Sydney Lee
 Paul Nash
 Iain Macnab
 Gwenda Morgan
 Herry Perry
 Hester Sainsbury
 Leon Underwood

References

External links
 
Artist Biographies: British and Irish Artists of the 20th Century

Wood, Society
Woodworking
Art and design-related professional associations
Arts organisations based in the United Kingdom